Auto da Pimenta is the sixth studio album by Rui Veloso, released in 1991.

Track listing
Disc 1Disc 2

Certifications and sales

References

External links
Auto da Pimenta at Rate Your Music
Auto da Pimenta at moo.pt 

1991 albums
Rui Veloso albums